Form D is a SEC filing form to be used to file a notice of an exempt offering of securities under Regulation D of the U.S. Securities and Exchange Commission. Commission rules require the notice to be filed by companies and funds that have sold securities without registration under the Securities Act of 1933 in an offering based on a claim of exemption under Rule 504 or 506 of Regulation D or Section 4(6) of that statute. Commission rules further require the notice to be filed within 15 days after the first sale of securities in the offering. For this purpose, the date of first sale is the date on which the first investor is irrevocably contractually committed to invest. If the due date falls on a Saturday, Sunday or holiday, it is moved to the next business day.

Privately held companies that raise capital are required to file a Form D with the SEC to declare exempt offering of securities. Many of these filings show investments in small, growing companies through venture capital and angel investors, as well as certain pooled investment funds.

References

External links
 SEC Form D Guide
 FormDs - funding news for startups and hedge fund launches

SEC filings